Gowharan Rural District is in the Central District of Khoy County, West Azerbaijan province, Iran. At the National Census of 2006, its population was 9,821 in 2,373 households. There were 10,799 inhabitants in 2,939 households at the following census of 2011. At the most recent census of 2016, the population of the rural district was 11,161 in 3,375 households. The largest of its 10 villages was Saidabad, with 3,255 people.

References 

Khoy County

Rural Districts of West Azerbaijan Province

Populated places in West Azerbaijan Province

Populated places in Khoy County